4'-Methyl-α-pyrrolidinobutiophenone or MPBP is a stimulant compound which has been reported as a novel designer drug. It is closely related to pyrovalerone, being simply its chain-shortened homologue.

See also 
 α-Pyrrolidinobutiophenone (α-PBP)
 3',4'-Methylenedioxy-α-pyrrolidinobutiophenone (MDPBP)

References 

Designer drugs
Stimulants
Pyrrolidinophenones
4-Tolyl compounds